Héctor Damián Steinert (born 25 February 1986 in Paraná, Entre Ríos) is an Argentine football winger who plays as a forward for Unión de Crespo in the Torneo Federal C.

Steinert made his debut for Newell's in 2004 and was part of the squad that won the Apertura 2004 championship. In 2009, he played in Racing Club.

Titles

External links
 Argentine Primera statistics
 Football-Lineups player profile

1986 births
Living people
People from Paraná, Entre Ríos
Argentine footballers
Argentine expatriate footballers
Association football wingers
Newell's Old Boys footballers
Racing Club de Avellaneda footballers
Bursaspor footballers
Argentine Primera División players
Süper Lig players
Expatriate footballers in Paraguay
Expatriate footballers in Turkey
Argentine people of Volga German descent
Sportspeople from Entre Ríos Province